Markram may refer to:

 Aiden Markram (born 1994), South African cricketer
 Henry Markram (born 1962), South African professor neuroscience in Switzerland, married to Kamila Markram
 Kamila Markram, neuroscientist in Switzerland, married to Henry Markram
 Mark Ramprakash (born 1969), English cricketer